This is a list of islands of Slovakia.

Danube

Between Komárno and Štúrovo
Veľký ostrov
Čenkovský ostrov (ca 10 ha) - between the municipalities of Kravany nad Dunajom, Komárno District and Obid, Nové Zámky District
Barnabáš - Močiansky ostrov - near the municipality of Moča, Komárno District

Between Komárno and Bratislava
 Žitný ostrov - the largest river island in Europe
 Malý Žitný ostrov 
 Veľkolélsky ostrov, Veľký Lél (formerly a true island, nowadays a peninsula) - near the municipality of Zlatná na Ostrove, Komárno District 
 Benkove ostrovy (ca 0.6 ha) - west of the municipality of Kalinkovo
 Ostrov kormoránov 
 Dunajský ostrov 
 Obecný ostrov 
 Ostrov orliaka morského, "White-tailed Eagle Island" (ca 22.77 ha) - near municipality of Baka, Dunajská Streda District
 Vtáčí ostrov, "Bird Island" (ca 6.86 ha) - southwest of Šamorín

in Bratislava
 Sihoť
 Slovanský ostrov

Váh river
 Kúpeľný ostrov ("Spa Isle") in Piešťany (former true river island, nowadays a thinly connected peninsula)
 River island near Kolárovo

Water reservoirs

Islands and islets on large man-made reservoirs.

 Islet on Zlaté piesky (Zlaté piesky)
 Slanický ostrov (Oravská priehrada)
 Vtáčí ostrov (Oravská priehrada)
 Islet near Hôrka (Zemplínska Šírava)

Former islands
ostrov Červenej armády (formerly a true island, nowadays a peninsula)

References

Slovakia
 
Islands